Rapture Ready is an Evangelical Christian website, originally an Usenet forum, founded by Todd Strandberg in 1987, that promotes the belief that the rapture will occur in the near future, with true Christians being taken up to Heaven. The site tracks the real-world occurrence of events that Strandberg believes are prophesied in the Bible, and uses these to calculate what Strandberg sees as the approach of the rapture.

Originally, Rapture Ready (then called "Rapture Index") consisted of threads in Usenet newsgroups such as alt.bible.prophecy and alt.christnet.second-coming.real-soon-now. In 1995, Rapture Index became a website. In 1997, it was renamed "Rapture Ready".

Features

The "Rapture Index" keeps track of activities which Strandberg believes could be indicators of a time when the Rapture might occur. The index includes Strandberg's numerical measurement of world events and trends in light of conservative Christian views on Bible prophecy regarding the end times.

See also 
 Doomsday Clock

References

Further reading

External links

 Rapture Ready Official Website

Christian eschatology
Christian websites
Internet properties established in 1995